Frigoglass is a manufacturer in commercial refrigeration and West Africa's leading glass producer.

Frigoglass has operations in many countries across Europe, Asia, Africa and the Middle East including production hubs in Romania, Russia, Greece, India, Indonesia, South Africa and Nigeria, in addition to sales offices in Hungary, Germany, Poland, Norway, Turkey and Kenya. The company's customer base consists of the Coca-Cola Company bottlers (Coca-Cola Hellenic, Coca-Cola European Partners, BIG, Coca-Cola Amatil, Coca-Cola Sabco), brewers (Heineken, SABMiller, Carlsberg, ABInbev, Efes), Pepsi, and dairy companies (Nestle, Danone).

Glass operations consist of two glass plants with three furnaces, two plastic crates production facilities and one metal crown production facility in Nigeria.

The company's stock is 48.55% owned by Truad Verwaltungs AG and trades in the Athens Stock exchange.

References

External links

Greek brands
Manufacturing companies of Greece
Companies listed on the Athens Exchange